"I Was Right and You Were Wrong" is the first single from Scottish band Deacon Blue's first greatest hits album, Our Town - The Greatest Hits. Produced by Steve Osborne, the song reached number 32 on the UK Singles Chart.

Release
The single's first B-side is "Mexico Rain", produced by Osborne and Paul Oakenfold. The other new B-side is a live cover of Dusty Springfield's "Goin' Back". Though labeled simply as "Wages Day", the fourth track on the CD single is an acoustic piano version of the song.

As with the previous two single releases, a special edition CD single with three tracks from the Riches bonus album was issued, entitled "Riches Collection". In addition to "I Was Right and You Were Wrong", it contains three tracks from Riches. This was the last "Riches Collection" release, leaving two tracks from Riches, the cover of "Angeliou" and the Bob Clearmountain remix of "Dignity", excluded from this collection.

Track listings
All songs were written by Ricky Ross, except where noted.

7-inch and cassette single  (660222 7; 660222 4)
 "I Was Right and You Were Wrong"  – 4:54
 "Mexico Rain" – 4:04

CD single  (660222 2)
 "I Was Right and You Were Wrong"  – 4:54
 "Mexico Rain" – 4:04
 "Goin' Back" (live from the Dublin Feile, Ireland, 1993) (Goffin, King) – 3:24
 "Wages Day [Piano Version]" – 3:18

Special Edition CD single: Riches Collection  (660222 5)
 "I Was Right and You Were Wrong" (extended version)  – 5:33
 "Kings of the Western World" – 2:40
 "Suffering" – 2:44
 "Raintown" (piano version) – 3:40

Charts

References

Deacon Blue songs
1994 singles
1994 songs
Columbia Records singles
Songs written by Ricky Ross (musician)